Dr Nalinda Jayatissa  (born 21 April 1977) is a Sri Lankan politician and a member of the Parliament of Sri Lanka. He was elected from Kalutara District in 2015. He is a Member of the Janatha Vimukthi Peramuna.

He is a Medical Doctor.

References

Living people
Members of the 15th Parliament of Sri Lanka
1977 births
Janatha Vimukthi Peramuna politicians